Dennis Arnold Drew (born 8 August 1957) is the keyboardist for the American alternative rock band 10,000 Maniacs. He has been with the band since its inception in 1981 and is one of three founding members along with Steve Gustafson and John Lombardo in the current band lineup. Drew also spent 17 years as general manager of WRFA-LP, a low-power nonprofit radio station in Jamestown, New York.

Discography
With 10,000 Maniacs
Human Conflict Number Five (EP) (1982)
Secrets of the I Ching (1983)
The Wishing Chair (1985)
In My Tribe (1987)
Blind Man's Zoo (1989)
Hope Chest: The Fredonia Recordings 1982-1983 (1990)
Our Time in Eden (1992)
MTV Unplugged (1993)
Love Among the Ruins (1997)
The Earth Pressed Flat (1999)
Campfire Songs: The Popular, Obscure and Unknown Recordings (2004)
Live Twenty-Five (2006)
Extended Versions (2009)
Triangles (EP) (2011)
Music From The Motion Picture (2013)
Twice Told Tales (2015)
For Crying Out Loud (EP) (2016)
Playing Favorites (2016)
Live at the Belly Up (2017)

References

External links

Official Site - 10,000 Maniacs
WRFA-LP  - WRFA 107.9 official site

10,000 Maniacs members
1957 births
Living people
20th-century American keyboardists
21st-century American keyboardists
Songwriters from New York (state)
People from Jamestown, New York